A death clock may refer to:

An estimate of life expectancy, often tongue-in-cheek
Trump Death Clock